Russell Dykstra (born 31 December 1966) is an Australian actor of screen, stage and TV.

Early life
Dykstra grew up in the Brisbane suburb of Calamvale.

Dykstra first appeared on stage at age 10 in a theatre production of Toad of Toad Hall. He later studied acting at the University of Southern Queensland, and in his early career worked alongside fellow actor Geoffrey Rush with the Grin and Tonic theatre troupe. Dykstra also studied at the school of Jacques Lecoq in Paris and Philippe Gaulier in London.

Career 
Dykstra’s one-man show Children of the Devil toured nationally in 1996-98 with funding from the Australia Council, earning him a Matilda Award and a  Victorian Green Room Award nomination for Best Actor.

Shortly thereafter Dykstra made his feature film debut in the critically acclaimed Soft Fruit, directed by Christina Andreef, for which he received an AFI Award for Best Actor in a Leading Role (1999) and a Film Critics’ Circle Award nomination (2000).

In 2007 Dykstra was nominated for an AFI Award for Best Supporting Actor for his performance in Romulus, My Father directed by Richard Roxburgh. Other film appearances include Oranges and Sunshine, Clubland, Lantana, Garage Days, Ned Kelly, View from Greenhaven Drive, The Wannabes and Hey, Hey, It's Esther Blueburger.

Dykstra’s theatre credits are extensive, including God of Carnage, The Wonderful World of Dissocia, The Unlikely Prospect of Happiness, for the Sydney Theatre Company and Babyteeth, Ray’s Tempest, The Underpants, The Laramie Project, Yibiyung and The Ham Funeral for Company B. His performances in Toy Symphony and Stuff Happens earning him national theatre Helpmann Awards for Best Supporting Actor in 2006 and 2008 and a Sydney Theatre Award (2007). Dykstra has also worked with the Malthouse Theatre, Theatre of Image, Griffin Theatre, Ensemble, La Boite Theatre and The Queensland Theatre Company.

Television credits include the Australian TV series Spirited, Wild Boys, My Place, Scorched, Blackjack, ABC TV’s Loot, All Saints and White Collar Blue.

Dykstra is perhaps most well known for his portrayal of the character Barney, in the award winning ABC TV series Rake.

In 2013 Dykstra appeared as Uncle Fester in the Australian production of the Broadway musical The Addams Family. For this performance Dykstra was honored with his third Helpmann Award, for Best Male Actor in a Supporting Role in a Musical (2013).

Currently Dykstra is playing Pumbaa in the Australian tour of Disney's The Lion King. For this performance Dykstra received a Sydney Theatre Award nomination for Best Performance by an Actor in a Musical (2013) and was nominated Best Male Actor in a Supporting Role in a Musical at the 14th Annual Helpmann Awards.

In 2015 Dykstra won his second Equity Award, for Most Outstanding Ensemble in a Drama Series, for his portrayal of Barney in the ABC TV series Rake.

Filmography

Awards and nominations

References

External links
 

Australian male film actors
Australian male television actors
Australian male stage actors
Helpmann Award winners
Living people
Male actors from Brisbane
1966 births
20th-century Australian male actors
21st-century Australian male actors